New Taipei City Constituency IX includes all Yonghe and part of Zhonghe in New Taipei City. The district was formerly known as Taipei County Constituency IX (2008-2010) and was created in 2008, when all local constituencies of the Legislative Yuan were reorganized to become single-member districts.

Current district
 Yonghe
 Zhonghe:
Villages:Tai'an(泰安里), Anping(安平里), Zhong'an(中安里), Anle(安樂里), Yi'an(宜安里), Anshun(安順里), Anhe(安和里), Xiuming(秀明里), Xiuren(秀仁里), Xiushan(秀山里), Xiufu(秀福里), Xiuyi(秀義里), Xiujing(秀景里), Xiushui(秀水里), Xiushi(秀士里), Xiucheng(秀成里), Xiufeng(秀峰里)

Legislators

Election results

 

 
 
 
 
 
 
 
 
 

2008 establishments in Taiwan
Constituencies established in 2008
Constituencies in New Taipei